Atractus boulengerii is a species of snake in the family Colubridae. The species can be found in Colombia.

References 

Atractus
Reptiles of Colombia
Endemic fauna of Colombia
Snakes of South America
Reptiles described in 1896
Taxa named by Mario Giacinto Peracca